|}

The Queen Anne Stakes is a Group 1 flat horse race in Great Britain open to horses aged four years or older. It is run at Ascot over a distance of 1 mile (1,609 metres), and is scheduled to take place each year in June.

History
The event was established in 1840, and during the early part of its history it was called the Trial Stakes. It was originally open to horses aged three or older. In 1930, it was renamed in honour of Queen Anne, the founder of Ascot Racecourse.

The Queen Anne Stakes was classed as a Group 3 race in 1971, and it was promoted to Group 2 level in 1984. It was given Group 1 status in 2003, and at this point the minimum age of participating horses was raised to four.

It is now the first race on the opening day of the Royal Ascot meeting.

Records
Most successful horse (2 wins):
 Flambeau – 1840, 1841
 Toastmaster – 1885, 1886
 Worcester – 1895, 1896
 Dean Swift – 1906, 1907

Leading jockey (7 wins):
 Frankie Dettori – Markofdistinction (1990), Allied Forces (1997), Intikhab (1998), Dubai Destination (2003), Refuse to Bend (2004), Ramonti (2007), Palace Pier (2021)

Leading trainer (7 wins):
 Saeed bin Suroor – Charnwood Forest (1996), Allied Forces (1997), Intikhab (1998), Cape Cross (1999), Dubai Destination (2003), Refuse to Bend (2004), Ramonti (2007)

Leading owner (8 wins):
 Godolphin – Charnwood Forest (1996), Allied Forces (1997), Intikhab (1998), Cape Cross (1999), Dubai Destination (2003), Refuse to Bend (2004), Ramonti (2007), Ribchester (2017)

Winners since 1971

Earlier winners

 1840: Flambeau
 1841: Flambeau
 1842: Satirist
 1843: Poison
 1844: Corranna
 1845: The Libel
 1846: The Conjuror
 1847: Prussic Acid
 1848: War Eagle
 1849: Collingwood
 1850: Flatcatcher
 1851: The Moor
 1852: Officious
 1853: Ariosto
 1854: Crosslanes
 1855: Coroner
 1856: Spindle
 1857: The Early Bird
 1858: Rosabel
 1859: Sedbury
 1860: Cock-a-hoop
 1861: Buccaneer
 1862: Duke Rollo
 1863: Tippler
 1864: Auditor
 1865: Heir-in-Law
 1866: Out and Outer
 1867: Black Diamond
 1868: filly by Newminster
 1869: Vagabond
 1870: Green Riband
 1871: Sir Hugo
 1872: Como
 1873: Moorlands
 1874: Thunder
 1875: Conductor
 1876: Jester
 1877: Plaisante
 1878: Post Haste
 1879: Alchemist
 1880: Ragman
 1881: Cradle
 1882: Valentino
 1883: Geheimniss
 1884: Legacy
 1885: Toastmaster
 1886: Toastmaster
 1887: no race
 1888: Zest
 1889: Nasr-el-Din
 1890: True Blue II
 1891: Caliche
 1892: Tostig
 1893: Workington
 1894: Best Man
 1895: Worcester
 1896: Worcester
 1897: Kilcock
 1898: Collar
 1899: Good Luck
 1900: colt by Torpedo
 1901: Watershed
 1902: Rose Blair
 1903: Littleton
 1904: Grey Plume
 1905: Nabot
 1906: Dean Swift
 1907: Dean Swift
 1908: Llangwm
 1909: St Michan
 1910: Whisk Broom
 1911: Hornet's Beauty
 1912: Berrilldon
 1913: Lomond
 1914: Bridge of Orchy
 1915–18: no race
 1919: Ciceronnetta
 1920: Comrade
 1921: Plymstock
 1922: Collaborator
 1923: Friar
 1924: Brimstone
 1925: Sunderland
 1926: Bulger
 1927: Sundry
 1928: Fohanaun
 1929: Aristotle
 1930: The Recorder
 1931: Coldstream
 1932: Unlikely
 1933: Madagascar
 1934: Spend a Penny
 1935: Fair Trial
 1936: Hindoo Holiday
 1937: Tempest II
 1938: St Magnus
 1939: Mac Kann
 1940–45: no race
 1946: Royal Charger
 1947: Woodruffe
 1948: Solina
 1949: Pambidian
 1950: Garrick
 1951: Neron
 1952: Southborne
 1953: Argur
 1954: Upadee
 1955: Golden Planet
 1956: Kandy Sauce
 1957: Baron's Folly
 1958: Teynham
 1959: Lucky Guy
 1960: Blast
 1961: Amber Light
 1962: Nereus
 1963: Welsh Rake
 1964: Princelone
 1965: Showdown
 1966: Tesco Boy
 1967: Good Match
 1968: Virginia Gentleman
 1969: Town Crier
 1970: Welsh Pageant
 1971: Roi Soleil

See also
 Horse racing in Great Britain
 List of British flat horse races
 Recurring sporting events established in 1840 – this race is included under its original title, Trial Stakes.

References
 Paris-Turf:
 Racing Post:

 galopp-sieger.de – Queen Anne Stakes (ex Trial Stakes).
 ifhaonline.org – International Federation of Horseracing Authorities – Queen Anne Stakes (2019).
 

Specific

Flat races in Great Britain
Ascot Racecourse
Open mile category horse races
British Champions Series
Breeders' Cup Challenge series
1840 establishments in England
Recurring sporting events established in 1840